Cynthia 'Cindy' F.W. Evans (born July 26, 1952 in Urbana, Illinois) is an American politician and a former Democratic member of the Hawaii House of Representatives, representing District 7 from 2003 to 2018.

Education
Evans earned her BA from The Evergreen State College.

Elections
2002 When Republican Representative Ron Davis was redistricted to District 13, Evans was unopposed for the open District 7 seat in the September 21, 2002 Democratic Primary, winning with 1,573 votes, and won the November 5, 2002 General election with 3,400 votes (49.0%) against incumbent Republican Representative nominee Jim Rath, who had been redistricted from District 6.
2004 Evans was unopposed for the September 18, 2004 Democratic Primary, winning with 2,316 votes, and won the November 2, 2004 General election with 4,671 votes (55.3%) against Republican nominee Bill Sanborn.
2006 Evans and Sanborn were both unopposed for their September 26, 2006 primaries, setting up a rematch; Evans won the November 7, 2006 General election with 3,977 votes (59.8%) against Sanborn.
2008 Evans was unopposed for the September 20, 2008 Democratic Primary, winning with 2,550 votes, and won the November 4, 2008 General election with 6,250 votes (62.1%) against Republican nominee Ronald Dela Cruz.
2010 Evans won the September 18, 2010 Democratic Primary with 2,585 votes (67.5%), and won the November 2, 2010 General election with 4,361 votes (57.4%) against Republican nominee Scott Henderson.
2012 Evans was unopposed for both the August 11, 2012 Democratic Primary, winning with 3,426 votes, and the November 6, 2012 General election.

References

External links
Official page at the Hawaii State Legislature
 

1952 births
Living people
Democratic Party members of the Hawaii House of Representatives
People from Urbana, Illinois
Evergreen State College alumni
Women state legislators in Hawaii
21st-century American politicians
21st-century American women politicians